The 2022 Asian Girls' U18 Volleyball Championship will be the 13th edition of the Asian Girls' U18 Volleyball Championship, a biennial international women's volleyball tournament organised by the Asian Volleyball Confederation (AVC) with Thailand Volleyball Association (TVA) for the girls' under–18 national teams of Asia.

The tournament will be held in Nakhon Pathom, Thailand, from 6 to 13 June 2022. Earlier, this tournament was due to be hosted by Uzbekistan on the same dates, but due to some unforeseen reasons, Nakhon Pathom has replaced Tashkent as the host city of the eight-day Championship, also adjusted to Asian Girls' U18 Championship as approved by the AVC Board of Administration.

Same as previous editions, the tournament acted as the AVC qualifiers for the FIVB Volleyball Girls' U19 World Championship. The top four teams qualified for the 2023 FIVB Volleyball Girls' U19 World Championship as the AVC representatives.

A total of eleventh teams played in the tournament, with players born on or after 1 January 2005 eligible to participate. It was originally U-17 competition for players born on or after 2006, but later was changed to U-18, so the age restriction was also changed to 2005.

Qualified teams
Following the AVC regulations, The maximum of 16 teams in all AVC events will be selected by
1 team for the host country
10 teams based on the final standing of the previous edition
5 teams from each of 5 zones (with a qualification tournament if needed)

Qualified associations

Format and Pools composition
According to the unveiled competition schedule, all participating teams have been split into Pool A and Pool B. Teams will compete in pool round-robin preliminaries, with top two teams in each pool advancing to the cross semifinals. Teams finishing 3rd and 4th in each pool will next strut their stuff in the classification round for 5th–8th places, while those finishing 5th and 6th in each pool will fight for 9th, 10th and 11th places.

Venues
The tournament will be host in Nakhon Pathom Sports Center Gymnasium, located in Mueang Nakhon Pathom, Nakhon Pathom.

Pool standing procedure
 Total number of victories (matches won, matches lost)
 In the event of a tie, the following first tiebreaker will apply: The teams will be ranked by the most point gained per match as follows:
 Match won 3–0 or 3–1: 3 points for the winner, 0 points for the loser
 Match won 3–2: 2 points for the winner, 1 point for the loser
 Match forfeited: 3 points for the winner, 0 points (0–25, 0–25, 0–25) for the loser
 If teams are still tied after examining the number of victories and points gained, then the FIVB will examine the results in order to break the tie in the following order:
 Set quotient: if two or more teams are tied on the number of points gained, they will be ranked by the quotient resulting from the division of the number of all set won by the number of all sets lost.
 Points quotient: if the tie persists based on the set quotient, the teams will be ranked by the quotient resulting from the division of all points scored by the total of points lost during all sets.
 If the tie persists based on the point quotient, the tie will be broken based on the team that won the match of the Round Robin Phase between the tied teams. When the tie in point quotient is between three or more teams, these teams ranked taking into consideration only the matches involving the teams in question.

Preliminary round
All times are Indochina Time (UTC+07:00)

Pool A

|}

 

 
 
 
 

 
 

|}

Pool B

|}

 

 
 
 
 

 
 

 

 
 
 
|}

Final round 
All times are Indochina Time (UTC+07:00)

9th–11th Classification round

9th–11th semifinals 
  
|}

9th place match 
  
|}

5th–8th Classification round

5th–8th semifinals 
 
 
|}

7th place match
  
|}

5th place match
  
|}

Final Four

Semifinals 
 
 
|}

3rd place match
  
|}

Final
  
|}

Final standing

Awards

Most Valuable Player
 Omori Sae
Best Setter
 Yoshida Sanae
Best Outside Spikers
 Omori Sae
 Chen Xinyue

Best Middle Blockers
 Shan Linqian
 Kim Sebeen
Best Opposite Spiker
 Wang Yindi
Best Libero
 Nishikawa Rin

See also
2022 Asian Boys' U18 Volleyball Championship

References

External links
 Asian Volleyball Confederation

2022 in volleyball
2022
Asian U18 Championship
June 2022 sports events in Thailand
Asian Girls' U18 Volleyball Championship